Gustav Hensel (23 October 1884 – 29 August 1933) was a German international footballer.

References

1884 births
1933 deaths
Association football forwards
German footballers
Germany international footballers